Leverett A. Saltonstall (September 1, 1892June 17, 1979) was an American lawyer and politician from Massachusetts. He served three two-year terms as the 55th Governor of Massachusetts, and for more than twenty years as a United States senator (1945–1967). Saltonstall was internationalist in foreign policy and moderate on domestic policy, serving as a well-liked mediating force in the Republican Party. He was the only member of the Republican Senate leadership to vote for the censure of Joseph McCarthy.

Early years

Leverett Saltonstall was born in Chestnut Hill, Massachusetts, to Richard Middlecott Saltonstall and Eleanor Brooks Saltonstall. The Saltonstall family, a wealthy Boston Brahmin family, had deep colonial roots, as did that of his mother. Saltonstall was able to trace his ancestral roots to the Mayflower; his grandfather and great-grandfather, both also named Leverett Saltonstall.  His father was a lawyer; his mother was the daughter of Peter C. Brooks III, a beneficiary of the large fortune of his same-named grandfather.

He was educated at the private Noble and Greenough School, and then attended the Evans School for Boys in Mesa, Arizona, an upper-crust ranch school, along with Nicholas Roosevelt, nephew to family friend Theodore Roosevelt.  He then entered Harvard, graduating in 1914, and graduated from Harvard Law School in 1917.  He was active in varsity sports at Harvard, notably serving as captain of the Junior Varsity crew team that won the prestigious Grand Challenge Cup at the Henley Royal Regatta in 1914 – the first American crew ever to do so.  He also played football and hockey, scoring a dramatic overtime goal in a 1914 win over the legendary Hobey Baker's Princeton team.

Saltonstall married Alice Wesselhoeft (1893–1981) of Jaffrey, New Hampshire, in 1916, while still in law school. Together they had six children, including Emily (1920–2006), at one time the daughter-in-law of Richard Byrd and a former WAVE; Peter Brooks Saltonstall, killed in action  on Guam in 1944; William L. Saltonstall (1927–2009), a member of the Massachusetts Senate; and Susan (1930–1994), a horse breeder.

Military service and entry into politics
After graduation, Saltonstall entered the United States Army.  He served as a first lieutenant in the 301st Field Artillery Regiment in the 76th Division in World War I, spending six months in France.  He was discharged in 1919, and then entered the law firm of his uncle.

Saltonstall, a socially progressive Republican, entered politics as an alderman in Newton, Massachusetts, serving from 1920 to 1922, while simultaneously serving as second assistant district attorney of Middlesex County under his uncle, Endicott Peabody Saltonstall, from 1921 to 1922. He was elected to the Massachusetts House of Representatives that same year; there he rose to the position of Speaker of the House, which he held from 1929 to 1937.

In 1930 Saltonstall became a compatriot of the Massachusetts Society of the Sons of the American Revolution.

Governor of Massachusetts

In 1936, Saltonstall decided to seek the Republican nomination for Governor of Massachusetts.  In the party convention, conservative forces prevailed in securing the nomination for John W. Haigis.  Saltonstall's friends were able to engineer his nomination for lieutenant governor.  Both Haigis and Saltonstall were defeated by their Democratic rivals, although Saltonstall's margin of defeat, just over 7,000 votes, was small enough to merit a recount; he demurred.  He ran again for governor two years later, and won a decisive victory over former Boston Mayor James Michael Curley, who had been involved in a bruising Democratic primary fight against the incumbent Charles F. Hurley.

He was reelected in 1940 and 1942; the 1940 election win was by an extremely narrow margin. During his tenure, Saltonstall mediated a Teamsters strike, reduced taxes, and retired 90 percent of the state's debt. He served as president of the National Governors Association from 1943 to 1944. In 1944, he also served as the fifth president of the Council of State Governments.

U.S. Senator

In 1944, Saltonstall was elected to the United States Senate in a special election to fill the unexpired term created by the resignation of U.S. Senator Henry Cabot Lodge, Jr. He was re-elected three times, serving from 1945 to 1967. Early in his first term, in April 1945 he was one of a dozen Senators and Congressmen who toured the Buchenwald Concentration Camp at the invitation of Gen. Dwight Eisenhower to attest to the reality of Nazi atrocities. Those he defeated included John H. Corcoran in 1944, John I. Fitzgerald in 1948, Foster Furcolo in 1954, and Thomas J. O'Connor in 1960. During his tenure in the Senate, he served as the Senate Republican Whip and on five influential Senate committees. He also served as the chair of the Senate Republican Conference, 1957–1966.  He was viewed as a political moderate, and served as a mediating force between the party's conservative and progressive wings.  He was an unspectacular but effective legislator, good at drafting legislation and finding compromise language.  When he left office, after more than thirty years in politics, he had few political enemies. Saltonstall voted in favor of the Civil Rights Acts of 1957, 1960, and 1964, as well as the 24th Amendment to the U.S. Constitution and the Voting Rights Act of 1965.

Death and legacy
Saltonstall opted not to run for reelection in 1966, in part to provide an opportunity for his seat to Edward Brooke, a rising star in Massachusetts Republican circles.  He retired to his farm in Dover, where he spent his remaining years as a gentleman farmer.

Leverett Saltonstall died of congestive heart failure in 1979 aged 86, and is buried in Harmony Grove Cemetery in Salem, Massachusetts. The Saltonstall Building in downtown Boston is named for him.

See also
 Massachusetts legislature: 1923–1924, 1925–1926, 1927–1928, 1929-1930, 1931–1932, 1933–1934, 1935–1936
 Massachusetts House of Representatives' 5th Middlesex district
 List of members of the American Legion

References

Sources

External links

|-

|-

|-

|-

|-

|-

|-

|-

|-

|-

|-

1892 births
1979 deaths
20th-century American politicians
United States Army personnel of World War I
American Unitarian Universalists
American Unitarians
County district attorneys in Massachusetts
Republican Party governors of Massachusetts
Harvard Crimson men's ice hockey players
Harvard Law School alumni
Massachusetts lawyers
Military personnel from Massachusetts
People from Dover, Massachusetts
Politicians from Newton, Massachusetts
Republican Party United States senators from Massachusetts
Speakers of the Massachusetts House of Representatives
Republican Party members of the Massachusetts House of Representatives
United States Army officers
Candidates in the 1948 United States presidential election
Noble and Greenough School alumni
Burials at Harmony Grove Cemetery
20th-century American lawyers